Basatin (also Basateen or sometimes Bustan) may refer to the following:

Iran
Basatin, Mahshahr, a village in Khuzestan Province
Besatin, a village in the Bushehr Province in Iran

Lebanon
Basateen, Lebanon, a village in the Mount Lebanon Governorate of Lebanon

Syria
Basatin al-Assad, a village in the Tartus Governorate of Syria

Tunisia
El Bassatine, a district of the city of Kasserine

See also
Bostan (disambiguation)
Bustan (disambiguation)